Mickaël Pereira (born 28 September 1991 in Grenoble, France) is a professional footballer who plays for A.D. Os Limianos as a midfielder.

References

External links

Portuguese League profile 

1991 births
Living people
French people of Portuguese descent
Sportspeople from Grenoble
Portuguese footballers
Footballers from Auvergne-Rhône-Alpes
Association football midfielders
Liga Portugal 2 players
Segunda Divisão players
S.C. Olhanense players
Vilaverdense F.C. players